Vasyl Kovalchuk (born April 18, 1973) is a Ukrainian sports-shooter. He won gold medals at both the 2012 and 2016 Summer Paralympics in the mixed 10 metre air rifle prone SH2. He also competed in both events in the mixed 10 metre air rifle standing SH2 competitions.

References

1973 births
Living people
Ukrainian male sport shooters
Paralympic shooters of Ukraine
Paralympic gold medalists for Ukraine
Paralympic medalists in shooting
Shooters at the 2012 Summer Paralympics
Shooters at the 2016 Summer Paralympics
Medalists at the 2012 Summer Paralympics
Medalists at the 2016 Summer Paralympics
Shooters at the 2020 Summer Paralympics
21st-century Ukrainian people